The Townsend Building (also known as the Old Drugstore) is a historic building located at 410 West Main Street in Lake Butler, Florida. Although damaged by fire, it retains significant architectural features which reflect the two-part block commercial design which was popular at the time, and Italian Renaissance Style.

Description and history 

It was added to the National Register of Historic Places on October 8, 1992.

See also
James W. Townsend House, also in Lake Butler
James W. Townsend House, in Orange Springs

References

External links
 Florida's Office of Cultural and Historical Programs
 Union County listings
 Townsend Building

Commercial buildings on the National Register of Historic Places in Florida
Buildings and structures in Union County, Florida
National Register of Historic Places in Union County, Florida